El abismo (English title:The abyss) is a Mexican telenovela produced by Televisa and transmitted by Telesistema Mexicano.

Cast 
Amparo Rivelles
Guillermo Aguilar
Jacqueline Andere
Héctor Andremar
Arturo Benavides
Chela Castro
Rosario Gálvez
Aarón Hernán
Rebeca Iturbide
Enrique Lizalde
Miguel Manzano
Ramiro Portillo
José G. Villarreal

References 

Mexican telenovelas
1965 telenovelas
Spanish-language telenovelas
Televisa telenovelas
1965 Mexican television series debuts
1965 Mexican television series endings